Hezhang is a county in the northwest of Guizhou province, China, bordering Yunnan to the north. It is under the administration of the prefecture-level city of Bijie.

Ethnic groups
The Hezhang County Gazetteer (2001:105-108) lists the following ethnic groups and their respective locations.

Bai: 3,856 persons (1995)
Qixingmin: located in Yongkang and Shanmuqing, Shuitangbao Township
Autonyms/Yi exonyms: Luoju, Zhuoluoju
Historical names: Boren and Baizi
Other names: Qixingmin and Minjia
Surnames: Zhang, Li, Su, Yang, Zhao, Xu, Qian
Locations: ancestors from Sandaohe, Weining County
Nanjingren (Yi exonym: Awutu )
Buyi: 2,939 persons (1995): in Nongchang Village, Kele Township (pop. 332)

Ethnic Bai are also found in:
Sanjiazhai, Kele Township
Wopi, Zexiong, Songlinpo Township

Mining
The county has large reserves of coal, iron, lead, zinc, and germanium. Mining had been and remains a major industry; however, inadequate management and regulation of zinc mining has resulted in widespread cadmium poisoning.

Climate

Notes

County-level divisions of Guizhou
Bijie